DeepaRaya is a name for the Deepavali and Hari Raya festivals, which are traditionally celebrated by Hindus and Muslims, respectively, in Malaysia as well as in Singapore. The word came about because of the occasional coincidental timing of the Hindu festival Deepavali and the Muslim festival of Eid ul-Fitr, referred to in the Malay language as Hari Raya Aidilfitri. In this sense, it is similar to the portmanteau of Kongsi Raya, which combines the Chinese New Year with Hari Raya.

Although the word "DeepaRaya" has been in use for some time, it came under criticism in the run-up to Deepavali and Eid ul-Fitr of 2005, when the mufti of the state of Perak criticised it and labeled it as "haram" or "illegal". A few Muslim Malay bloggers also criticised its usage.

See also
Chrismahanukwanzakah
Thanksgivukkah
Kongsi Raya

References
"Haram merayakan perayaan orang-orang kafir". Retrieved Oct. 31, 2005.
Juferi, Mohd Elfie Nieshaem (2005). "DeepaRaya? Sacriligeous!". Retrieved Oct. 31, 2005.
Ooi, Jeff (2004). "Not too late for DeepaRaya". Retrieved Oct. 31, 2005.

Malaysian culture